Hello Ladies is an American sitcom created by Stephen Merchant, Lee Eisenberg, and Gene Stupnitsky. It stars Merchant as an Englishman looking for love in modern Los Angeles.  The series premiered on the American network HBO on September 29, 2013. On January 23, 2014, HBO canceled the series; however, the series was concluded with a feature-length special, which aired on November 22, 2014.

Hello Ladies was adapted from Merchant's stand-up show of the same name. The show's title comes from the catchphrase Stuart uses at least once per episode.

Premise 
Stuart "Hello Ladies" Pritchard is a socially inept Englishman living in Los Angeles with the intent of finding the woman of his dreams. However, the unlucky Stuart keeps falling into situations that, more often than not, have him embarrassing himself in front of women. Those along for the ride include his best friend Wade, who is trying to cope with life as a bachelor again after he and his wife separate, and Jessica, an aspiring actress-screenwriter living in Stuart's guest-house.

Cast 
 Stephen Merchant as Stuart Pritchard
 Christine Woods as Jessica Vanderhoff
 Nate Torrence as Wade Bailey
 Kevin Weisman as Kives
 Kyle Mooney as Rory

Guest stars included Nicole Kidman, David Hornsby, Crista Flanagan, Jenny Slate, Lindsey Broad, Carly Craig, Eddie Pepitone, Lucy Punch, Marc Evan Jackson, Sean Wing and Sarah Wright.

Episodes

Season 1 (2013)

The Movie (2014)

Music 
The opening theme music is "Alone Too Long" by Hall & Oates. Credits music for each episode differs:

Season 1 (2013) 

 Episode 1: "Kiss You All Over" by Exile
 Episode 2: "Look Who's Lonely Now" by Bill LaBounty
 Episode 3: "You Belong to the City" by Glenn Frey
 Episode 4: "Year of the Cat" by Al Stewart
 Episode 5: "The Guitar Man" by Bread
 Episode 6: "Get It Right Next Time" by Gerry Rafferty
 Episode 7: "Oh Yeah" by Roxy Music
 Episode 8: "Marriage Bureau Rendezvous" by 10cc

Hello Ladies: The Movie (2014) 

"Some Like It Hot" by The Power Station, "Somebody" by Bryan Adams, "Sussudio" by Phil Collins, "Days Gone Down" by Gerry Rafferty

Home media 
"Hello Ladies: The Complete Series and the Movie" was released on DVD on May 26, 2015, which includes deleted scenes and making-of featurette. The complete collection is available in HD via iTunes and Amazon Prime Video, though no Blu-ray release has been announced. The series also are available on HBO Max in United States, Latin America and Europe.

References

External links 

2010s American single-camera sitcoms
2013 American television series debuts
2014 American television series endings
English-language television shows
HBO original programming
Television series by ABC Studios
Television series by Home Box Office
Television shows set in Los Angeles
2010s American sex comedy television series
Television series created by Stephen Merchant